Vagabond Skies is an EP by singer-songwriter Joseph Arthur, released June 10, 2008, and is the third in a series of four EPs released in anticipation of Arthur's seventh studio album, Temporary People. According to Arthur, this EP is "more stripped-down, more acoustic and slower...it's more of a late-night type of music."

The EP also marks the first studio recording of "She Paints Me Gold," a song Joseph has often played at his live shows since November 2004. A music video made for "She Paints Me Gold" features a sequential collection of still photographs, taken by Cerise Leang on New Year's Eve 2007, documenting one of Joseph's all-night paintings. Another music video was also produced for "Second Sight," directed by Gabriel Judet-Weinshel, featuring video footage of Joseph lip-synching the song projected onto a billboard over Lafayette Street and Grand Street in the Lower East Side of Manhattan.

Track listing

Notes
 Produced by Joseph Arthur, Mathias Schneeberger, and Mike Napolitano.
 Musicians:
 Joseph Arthur: vocals, guitar, bass, percussion, drums, keyboards, programming
 Mathias Schneeberger: electric guitar
 Kenny Siegal: acoustic guitar, piano  
 Joan Wasser: violin, background vocals
 Greg Wieczorek: drums 
 Ethan Eubanks: drums
 Rene Lopez: drums
 Cat Martino: background vocals on "She Paints Me Gold"
 Art direction and packaging design by Joseph Arthur.
 Photography by Danny Clinch.
 Lonely Astronaut Records #LA005.

References

External links
 Videos of "She Paints Me Gold" and "Second Sight" on Stereogum.com

Joseph Arthur albums
2008 EPs
Lonely Astronaut Records EPs